Pleven is a major town in Northern Bulgaria, capital of the Pleven Province.

Pleven may also refer to:

 Pleven Province, a province in Northern Bulgaria
 Pleven Municipality
 Siege of Plevna, an important battle during the Russo-Turkish War, 1877-78
 Pleven (horse), a horse breed
 Pléven, a commune in the Côtes-d'Armor department in France
 Pleven plan, a plan to create a supranational European army, proposed by René Pleven
 Pleven Medical University 
 Pleven Panorama

People with the surname
 René Pleven, French politician

See also 
 Plevna (disambiguation)